Veer Singh (born 15/02/1956,Jojkheda, District Jyotiba Phule Nagar (Uttar Pradesh)) a politician from Samajwadi Party, is a Member of the Parliament of India representing Uttar Pradesh in the Rajya Sabha, the upper house of the Indian Parliament.

He resides at Moradabad.

References

Living people
Bahujan Samaj Party politicians from Uttar Pradesh
Rajya Sabha members from Uttar Pradesh
1956 births
Samajwadi Party politicians from Uttar Pradesh